Richard Kaplan may refer to:
 Richard Kaplan (golfer), South African golfer
 Richard Kaplan (film producer), American documentary film and television writer, director, and producer
 Rick Kaplan, American television producer